Douglas Joseph Pirie (11 May 1907 – 19 June 1935) was an English motorcycle racer who won the Manx Grand Prix. He died, aged 28, in an accident during the 1935 Isle of Man TT races. He is buried at Southgate Cemetery, London.

Douglas Pirie Trophy
The Douglas Pirie Trophy is awarded to the winner of the Junior Manx Grand Prix. The current recipient is Nathan Harrison.

References

External links 

D.J.Pirie. Ramsey Hairpin, Isle of Man.

1907 births
1935 deaths
English motorcycle racers
Manx Grand Prix racers
Motorcycle racers who died while racing
People from the London Borough of Haringey
Sport deaths in the Isle of Man